Río Indio may refer to:
 Indio River, river in Puerto Rico, United States
 Río Indio, Coclé, corregimiento in Panama
 Río Indio, Colón, corregimiento in Panama